The 1919–20 Tennessee Volunteers basketball team represented the University of Tennessee during the 1919–20 college men's basketball season. The head coach was John R. Bender coaching the team in his first season. The Volunteers team captain was "Peg" Bell.

The 1920 Volunteer team was one of five colleges and universities invited to take place in the national AAU tournament in March of that year, marking the first postseason appearance for the school. They lost their first-round game to the hosting Atlanta Athletic Club.

Schedule

|-

|-
!colspan=12 style=|AAU National Championship

References

Tennessee Volunteers basketball seasons
Tennessee
Tennessee Volunteers
Tennessee Volunteers